The Azuma Bowl (あずまボウル) was an annual college football bowl game played in Japan to determine the winner of the Kantoh Collegiate American Football Association. It was discontinued after 2013, in favor of a new division format.

References

American football in Japan
1970 establishments in Japan
Recurring sporting events established in 1970
2013 disestablishments in Japan
Recurring sporting events disestablished in 2013